Giolla na Naomh O hUidhrin, Irish historian and poet, died 1420.

O hUidhrin is known as the author of Tuilleadh feasa ar Éirinn óigh, a topographical poem of a kind with Seán Mór Ó Dubhagáin's Triallam timcheall na Fodla, of which it is a supplement.

Although his obit is noted in all the main Irish annals, indicating he was regarded as a noteworthy man, nothing further is known of him.

References

 O hUidhrin, Giolla-na-naomh, Aidan Breen, in Dictionary of Irish Biography, p. 574, Cambridge, 2009.

15th-century Irish historians
15th-century Irish poets
1420 deaths
Year of birth unknown
Irish male poets
Irish-language writers